Denis Rolleston Gwynn (1893–1973) was an Irish  journalist, writer and professor of modern Irish history. He served in the British Army in World War I.

Life
Denis Gwynn was born on 6 March 1893, the third son of Stephen Gwynn, the Irish patriot, writer and Irish Parliamentary Party Member of Parliament. His mother was Mary ('May') Louisa Osborn Gwynn; his parents were first cousins. The middle name Rolleston was derived from Denis Gwynn's great grandmother Catherine Rolleston, who married his great grandfather John Gwynne.

Along with his mother and siblings, but not his father, Denis Gwynn was received into the Roman Catholic Church in 1902. He was educated at St. Enda's School Rathfarnham, Clongowes Wood College and at University College Dublin where he graduated BA (1914),  MA (1915) and D.Litt. (1932).

During World War I, in 1916, Gwynn enlisted in the Royal Munster Fusiliers. He served on the Western Front in France from 1916 to 1917, but was then invalided home and  worked for the remainder of the war at the British Ministry of Information.

After the war Gwynn worked as a journalist. He became assistant editor of the periodical Everyman in London, joined the National Press Agency, worked for a while as a reporter in Brittany and Paris, then in 1922 returned to London where he was active for many years as a journalist specialising in Irish Catholic issues. He was on the editorial staff of the Westminster Gazette and edited the Dublin Review from 1933 to 1939.

During World War II Gwynn retired to the Hampshire countryside and became a farmer.

In 1948 Gwynn returned to Ireland and took up the post of research professor of Modern Irish History at University College Cork. He remained in this post until his retirement in 1962. Professor Gwynn also acted as editor of the Cork University Press (1954–1962) and wrote a regular column called Now and Then in the Cork Examiner. He wrote several works of history and biography and was a contributor to Encyclopedia Britannica.

Denis Gwynn was married to Alice Trudeau (born in the US, 1904), the only daughter of Dr Edward Livingston Trudeau and Hazel Martyn, an American beauty who later became the wife of Irish artist John Lavery; for many years Hazel Lavery's face, as drawn by Lavery, featured on Irish banknotes.

Denis Gwynn died at his home in Malahide Dublin, on 10 January 1973 and was buried at Stamullen Cemetery Co Meath.

Literary Connection

The novelist Jessie Victor Rickard lived the final years of her life, until her death in 1963, at Denis Gwynn's house in Montenotte, Cork. Jessie Rickard was a close friend of Alice Gwynn.

Works
 The Catholic Reaction in France (1924)
 The Irish Free State, 1922-1927 (1928)
 A Hundred Years of Catholic Emancipation (1929)
 Daniel O’Connell, the Irish Liberator (1929)
 The Life and death of Roger Casement (1930)
 Edward Martyn and the Irish revival (1930)
 John Keogh: the pioneer of Catholic Emancipation (1930) (1934)
 Daniel O’Connell and Ellen Courtney (1930)
 The Life of John Redmond (1932)
 De Valera (1933)
 The O'Gorman Mahon (1934)
 The Vatican and the War in Europe (1940)
 William Smith O'Brien (1946)
 Young Ireland and 1848 (1949)
 Cardinal Wiseman (1950)
 The history of Partition (1950)

Biographical sources
 A Dictionary of Irish History since 1800, D. J. Hickey & J. E. Doherty, Gill & MacMillan (1980)
 A Biographical Dictionary of Cork, Tim Cadogan & Jeremiah Falvey (2006), p. 117

References

1893 births
1973 deaths
Academics of University College Cork
Alumni of University College Dublin
Irish Examiner people
Irish non-fiction writers
Irish male non-fiction writers
Irish people of World War I
People educated at Clongowes Wood College
People from County Kildare
People from Malahide
20th-century non-fiction writers
People educated at St. Enda's School
British Army personnel of World War I
Royal Munster Fusiliers soldiers